May Moustafa (born 24 January 1983) is an Egyptian fencer. She competed in the women's épée event at the 2000 Summer Olympics, losing her only match.

References

External links
 

1983 births
Living people
Egyptian female épée fencers
Olympic fencers of Egypt
Fencers at the 2000 Summer Olympics